Lee Ji-hoon may refer to:

 Lee Ji-hoon (entertainer) (born 1979) South Korean singer and actor
 , South Korean actor
 Lee Ji-hoon (actor, born 1988) South Korean actor
 Lee Ji-hoon (sledge hockey) (born 1989)
 Lee Ji-hoon (singer, born 1996)